Teratopora haplodes is a moth in the family Erebidae. It was described by Edward Meyrick in 1889. It is found in New Guinea, where it has been recorded from Papua New Guinea and Papua. The habitat consists of lowland areas.

References

Moths described in 1889
Lithosiina